Gat Kola (also Romanized as Gat Kolā and Gat Kalā; also known as  Kat Kolā) is a village in Chelav Rural District, in the Central District of Amol County, Mazandaran Province, Iran. At the 2006 census, its population was 44, in 9 families.

References 

Populated places in Amol County